Malapalla East Grama Niladhari Division is a Grama Niladhari Division of the Maharagama Divisional Secretariat of Colombo District of Western Province, Sri Lanka. It has Grama Niladhari Division Code 498.

St. Michael's College, Homagama are located within, nearby or associated with Malapalla East.

Malapalla East is a surrounded by the Homagama South, Malapalla West, Makumbura North, Rukmale West and Rukmale East B Grama Niladhari Divisions.

Demographics

Ethnicity 
The Malapalla East Grama Niladhari Division has a Sinhalese majority (98.2%). In comparison, the Maharagama Divisional Secretariat (which contains the Malapalla East Grama Niladhari Division) has a Sinhalese majority (95.7%)

Religion 
The Malapalla East Grama Niladhari Division has a Buddhist majority (97.1%). In comparison, the Maharagama Divisional Secretariat (which contains the Malapalla East Grama Niladhari Division) has a Buddhist majority (92.0%)

Gallery

References 

Grama Niladhari Divisions of Maharagama Divisional Secretariat